School District 98 may refer to:
 Berwyn North School District 98
 Dalzell Grade School District 98